The Operation Carne Fraca (Operation Weak Meat in Brazilian media in English), is an action started on March 17, 2017, and enforced by the Federal Police of Brazil, that country's federal police force, which investigated some of the country's largest meat processing companies.

The company JBS S.A. (which represents about a quarter of world's market on beef, and holds the trademarks Friboi, Seara Alimentos (Seara Foods), Swift Armour, and Vigor) and the BRF company (which holds the trademarks Perdigão  and Sadia) are accused of having mixed rotten meat treated with chemical components into meat sold in Brazil and abroad.

As a first consequence, more than 30 meat inspectors were fired. 
They allegedly allowed rotten meat to be sold, dates of expiration to be altered, meat of poor quality to be disguised and mixed with potentially carcinogenic chemical substances, according to Agência Nacional de Vigilância Sanitária (Anvisa), sorbic acid and the not for use authorized Vitamin C.

Economical impact  
Brazil is the leading exporter of beef and poultry, and the fourth largest pork exporter. Brazil's world market share in this business is about 7.2% The BRF Holding, which is controlled by Perdigão and Sadia, exports poultry to 120 countries and has a world market share of about 14%. Economics observers such as Bloomberg News expect a loss of market share of up to 10%.

Reaction

National 
Press
The main topic in national publications was the impact on the economy.

Politics
President Michel Temer announced an investigation and invited ambassadors to a steak dinner.

Brazil's government shut down three plants and suspended the export licenses for 21 meat packing plants too.

On 18 May 2017, the newspaper O Globo reported that the owner of JBS secretly recorded president Michel Temer giving him hush money to buy the silence of a potential witness against Temer.

International echo
Press
 The French newspaper Le Figaro saw the dismantling of a source of rotten meat.
 The New York Times wrote that this scandal raises doubts on Brazilian agriculture companies as a whole that could touch the country's economical future.
 The Financial Times saw consequences for Brazilian agriculture companies.
 The Telegraph followed Associated Press opinion.

Politics
 A first import ban was announced. Chile, China, Egypt, Hong Kong, Japan, and Mexico suspended all meat imports from Brazil, and the European Union banned meat from any plant that is implicated in the case. The United States began checking shipments of meat from Brazil and later suspended all meat imports from Brazil over quality concerns. This suspension arose in tariff talks with the US following a visit to Washington by Jair Bolsonaro.

Course 
In July 2017, Eumar Roberto Novacki, Brazil's secretary of state, in Geneva tried to convince European meat importers that Brazilian meat was of high quality. At the same time, new information on bribery of meat inspectors were published.

See also 
 List of food companies
 List of scandals in Brazil
 Operation Car Wash
 Joesley Batista

References

External link

Government of Michel Temer
Meat packing industry
Commercial crimes
Meat industry
Food and drink companies of Brazil
Agriculture companies of Brazil
2017 in Brazil
Food safety scandals